The NWA Central States United States Championship was the version of the NWA United States Heavyweight Championship that was defended in the Central States Wrestling territory around Missouri. It existed from 1961 until 1968. Records indicate that Bob Orton, The Viking and The Destroyer also held championship but no specific dates were found for those reigns.

Title History

Combined reigns

See also
National Wrestling Alliance
Central States Wrestling

Notes

References
General references

Specific references

External links
 NWA Central States United States Heavyweight Championship

Heart of America Sports Attractions championships
National Wrestling Alliance championships
NWA United States Heavyweight Championships